Straight Street, from the Latin Via Recta ( al-Shāriʿ al-Mustaqīm), known as the Street called Straight in the New Testament, is the old decumanus maximus, the main Roman road, of Damascus, Syria. It runs from east to west through the old city. According to the Acts of the Apostles (9:11), Paul the Apostle stayed in a house on Straight Street. 

The western half of the street, including the Midhat Pasha Souq, is today also known as "Midhat Pasha Street", while the eastern half, leading to the Bab Sharqi gate, is known as "Bab Sharqi Street".

History
According to the King James Version of the English bible:
"And the Lord said unto him (i.e. Ananias), Arise, and go into the street which is called Straight, and inquire in the house of Judas for one called Saul, of Tarsus: for, behold, he prayeth".

During the Greek period in Damascus, the city was re-designed by Hippodamus, who gave the city a grid structure. The longest of these streets, 1,500 metres in length across the city, was called Straight Street.

The Mariamite Cathedral of Damascus was built on Straight Street in the 2nd century, and has been rebuilt multiple times since then. It currently serves as the seat of the Antiochian Orthodox Church.

The western half of the street, including the Midhat Pasha Souq, is now named "Midhat Pasha Street", while the eastern half, leading to the Bab Sharqi gate is named "Bab Sharqi Street".

Gallery

References

External links

Ancient Damascus
Streets in Damascus